Jeong Min-Hyeong  (14 May 1987 – 4 July 2012) was a South Korean footballer who played as a midfielder for Busan IPark in the K-League.

He attended International University of Korea before embarking on a professional football career.

Death
On July 4, 2012, Jeong was found dead in his car which was parked in the outskirts of Yangju, Gyeonggi Province, after disappearing for 4 days. In the car police discovered a burned Yeontan and a suicide note.

References

External links 

1987 births
2012 deaths
Association football midfielders
South Korean footballers
Busan IPark players
K League 1 players
Suicides by carbon monoxide poisoning in South Korea
2012 suicides